Lysekil Municipality (Lysekils kommun) is a municipality in Västra Götaland County in western Sweden. Its seat is located in the city of Lysekil.

The present municipality was formed in 1971, when the City of Lysekil (instituted as such in 1903) was amalgamated with Stångenäs and the island of Skaftö.

Geography

Lysekil Municipality borders to the municipalities of Sotenäs (in the north-west), Munkedal (north) and Uddevalla (east). The city of Lysekil is located on the southern tip of the municipality, by the Kattegatt strait.

The bay to the east, marking the border to Uddevalla, is called Gullmarsfjorden, or Gullmarn. It is Sweden's only true fjord. It is 25 km long, between 1–3 km wide, with a maximum depth of 118.5 meters. The depth at the mouth is only 20–40 meters on average, leading to a distinctive marine life in the fjord. Gullmaren is currently Sweden's only marine nature preservation area, and is home to several marine research institutes due to it being an easily studied microclimate.

Some of the municipal islets are considered part of the Gothenburg archipelago. Many islets are like small communities by themselves, with interesting histories of trading, fishing and stone quarrying in addition to their scenic nature.

Localities
Lysekil (seat), 7,300 inhabitants
Brastad, 1,800
Lyse, 1,700
Brodalen, 1,050
Grundsund, 627
Fiskebäckskil, 438
Rixö, 357

History
In Lysekil, humans have long left a mark on water, wood, soil, and stone.

With protected harbor surrounded by water and jutting out toward the fisheries of Kattegatt, The North Sea, and beyond, Lysekil has deep ties to the fishing and canning industry.  Mirrored fish on the current municipal coat of arms and a jumping dolphin on that of 1895 show the absolute dominance of the sea on the area. 

To many outsiders, especially those coming from Stockholm and the East coast whose ocean access was only the salty waters of the Baltic Sea, The granite beach and sweet water of Gullmarsfjorden made Lysekil a famous bathing location in 19th century.  Kallbadhuset (the cold bathing house), a somewhat exclusive, and very popular wooden bathing house dating from 1847 still stands in operation. Local rumor has it that once upon a time the King of Sweden would visit the Lysekil bathing house and specifically ask that the commoners of the town be allowed enter the wooden walls of Kallbadhuset because he 'liked' the everyday people of Lysekil (whom otherwise were not welcome inside the Bathing house compound.

Traditionally fishing, sailing, farming, stone-cutting, and forestry formed the largest chunk of the local economy and continue today; however, petroleum products refining (Preemraff in Lyse,) light industry (Husqvarna in Brastad,) and local and international tourism (especially during the summertime,) all form a large part in the economy of the municipality.

Herring fishing
Herring fishing has played a big role in the history of Lysekil. For some reason the herring always returned close to the coastline in Bohuslän for longer periods of time and therefore made it easier for large amounts of fish to be caught. Herring fishing was popular already during the middle ages but most known is the periods of 1556-1589, 1747-1809 and 1877-1906. During these years, sales of salted herring resulted in hundreds of thousands of exports all over the world.

In Lysekil there are traces of old herring fisheries in several places, most of them on Härnäset, stora skeppsholmen and Saltö, as well as several factory buildings left where the herring was prepared and packaged.

Listed buildings
The municipality of Lysekil has three listed buildings. A listed building (byggnadsminne) is a building that is legally protected and preserved because of its cultural and historical significance. The county administrative board (Länsstyrelsen) and the Swedish national heritage board (Riksantikvarieämbetet) decides which buildings become listed buildings. The three buildings are:

 Curmanska villorna 
 Wilhelmsons villa 
 Härnäsets folkets hus 

Other buildings and areas of cultural and historical heritage in Lysekil are protected through detailed development plans under control of the municipality. Some of those places can for example be found in the old town area (Gamlestan), Fiskebäckskil and Östersidan.

Government and politics
Distribution of the 31 seats in the municipal council after the 2018 election:

Social Democratic Party   8
Lysekilspartiet   7  
Sweden Democrats   4
Moderate Party   3
Liberal People's Party   2
Communist Party   2
Centre Party   2
Left Party   2
Green Party   1

References
Official page
Articles Lysekil and :sv:Gullmarsfjorden on Swedish Wikipedia

External links

Lysekil Municipality - Official site
 Article Lysekil - From Nordisk Familjebok (1903)

Municipalities of Västra Götaland County
Gothenburg and Bohus